The Hogleifa is a mountain in the Bernese Alps, overlooking the Lötschental in the canton of Valais. It lies at the western end of the Bietschhorn-Aletschhorn chain.

References

External links
 Hogleifa on Hikr

Mountains of the Alps
Alpine three-thousanders
Mountains of Switzerland
Mountains of Valais
Bernese Alps